This Week may refer to:

 This Week (1956 TV programme), a 1956–1992 British current affairs television programme broadcast on ITV
 This Week (2003 TV programme), a weekly British political discussion television programme that aired on BBC One between 2003 and 2019
 This Week (American TV program), an American Sunday morning political interview and talk show program broadcast on ABC since 1981
 This Week (radio series), a Sunday radio show broadcast on RTÉ Radio 1 in Ireland
 This Week (album), a 2004 music album by rapper Jean Grae
 This Week (magazine), a defunct American magazine
 This Week (newspaper), a defunct national tourism newspaper for Wales

See also
 The Week (disambiguation)